John Wozniak (born March 24, 1977) is an American football coach and former player. He is currently the Running backs at Oklahoma State University. He has been heavily involved with either offense, special teams, or both at all of his stops, including Oklahoma State.

Playing career
Wozniak played Quarterback and Wide Receiver during his time at Knox College. After his senior season in 1998, he was named All-Midwest Conference honorable mention as a QB.

Coaching career

Knox College
Following Wozniak's playing career at Knox College, he immediately joined the coaching staff at his alma mater, where he served as the Tight end coach and Punters coach for the 1999 season. The next year, Wozniak was promoted to offensive coordinator, a position he held through the 2003 season.

Les Miles Connection
In 2004, Wozniak made the jump to division 1 football as he was hired by Les Miles at Oklahoma State. Wozniak was an offensive graduate assistant for one season, before following Miles to LSU for the 2005 season. After spending the 2006 season as the tight ends coach and special teams coordinator at Georgia Southern, Wozniak return for one more season with Miles at LSU as an offensive quality control coach. The 2007 season proved to be successful as the Tigers won the 2007 BCS National Championship game.

Special Teams Experience
In 2008, Wozniak returned to an on-the-field position, again as the tight ends coach and special teams coordinator at Montana State for head coach Rob Ash. Wozniak coach three All-Big Sky players in his lone season, as tight end Brandon Bostick, punter Erik Fisher, and kicker Jason Cunningham each earned all-conference honors.
The following season, Wozniak was hired by Tommy West to be the special teams coordinator for the Memphis Tigers football program. Unfortunately, the tigers struggled, and West and his staff were fired following the 2009 season.

Back to Offense
For the 2010 season, Wozniak was the offensive coordinator at West Georgia Wolves for head coach Daryl Dickey. 
In 2011, Wozniak was hired as the running backs coach at UAB by head coach Neil Callaway. Former Memphis head coach Tommy West was also hired to be the defensive coordinator for the team. Bad luck struck again, as the coaching staff was let go following the season.

Return to Special Teams
In 2012, Wozniak rebounded as he won another National Championship. This time, he was a special teams analyst for Nick Saban at Alabama
From 2013 through 2016, Wozniak served as the special teams coordinator at Southern Miss, while also coaching the teams wide receivers. Wozniak was hired by Todd Monken, who was the wide receivers coach at Oklahoma State during Wosniak's first year there. Wozniak and Monken also worked together at LSU, and even share the same alma mater. Wozniak was retained by new head coach Jay Hopson for the 2016 season.

Oklahoma State
Since 2017, Wozniak has been on the Oklahoma State coaching staff coaching the running backs. He has coached prominent players such as Justice Hill and Chuba Hubbard. He was hired by current Head Coach Mike Gundy, who was the offensive coordinator during Wozniak's first stop at OSU.

Personal life
Wozniak graduated from Knox with degrees in physics and secondary education in 1999. He is married to his wife, Jessica, and they have a daughter named Audrey.

References

1977 births
Living people
Sportspeople from Milwaukee
Players of American football from Milwaukee
American football quarterbacks
Knox Prairie Fire football players
American football wide receivers
Knox Prairie Fire football coaches
Oklahoma State Cowboys football coaches
LSU Tigers football coaches
Georgia Southern Eagles football coaches
Montana State Bobcats football coaches
Memphis Tigers football coaches
West Georgia Wolves football coaches
UAB Blazers football coaches
Alabama Crimson Tide football coaches
Southern Miss Golden Eagles football coaches